A constitutional referendum was held in the Republic of Dahomey on 5 January 1964. The main issues were changing the system of government to a presidential system, scrapping term limits for the president, and having a unicameral parliament. The referendum passed with 99.86% of voters approving the changes. Turnout was 92% of the 1,051,614 registered voters.

Results

References

Dahomey
Referendums in Benin
Constitutional
Constitutional referendums